Mashfield High School may refer to:
Marshfield High School (Massachusetts)
Marshfield High School (Missouri)
Marshfield High School (Coos Bay, Oregon)
Marshfield High School (Wisconsin)